is a passenger railway station in located in the city of Habikino,  Osaka Prefecture, Japan, operated by the private railway operator Kintetsu Railway.

Lines
Takawashi Station is served by the Minami Osaka Line, and is located 12.6 rail kilometers from the starting point of the line at Ōsaka Abenobashi Station.

Station layout
The station consists of two opposed side platforms connected by an underground passage.

Platforms

Adjacent stations

History
Takawashi Station opened on April 18, 1922.

Passenger statistics
In fiscal 2018, the station was used by an average of 6,647 passengers daily.

Surrounding area
Otsu Shrine
Shimaizumi Maruyama Kofun
Yoshimura Family Residence
Habikino City Takawashi Kita Elementary School
Habikino City Takawashi Elementary School

See also
List of railway stations in Japan

References

External links

 Kintetsu: Takawashi Station 

Railway stations in Japan opened in 1922
Railway stations in Osaka Prefecture
Habikino